Alobates (Motschulsky 1872) is a genus of darkling beetles in the family Tenebrionidae. The name likely comes from Greek 'alo' (variant of allo) meaning 'other', and 'bates' meaning 'one who treads/haunts'. There are at least two described species in Alobates. These species are often misidentified, but can be differentiated by a view of the mentum of the head ventral. A. barbatus have a tuft of long yellow setae, while A. pensylvanicus does not.

Species
These two species belong to the genus Alobates:
 Alobates barbatus (Knoch, 1801) b
 Alobates pensylvanicus (DeGeer, 1775) g b 
Data sources: i = ITIS, c = Catalogue of Life, g = GBIF, b = Bugguide.net

The species Alobates pensylvanicus is sometimes erroneously spelled "pennsylvanica" or "pensylvanica".

References

Further reading

External links

 

Tenebrionidae